Nicholas Pavia is an American politician.

He won a special election in January 1988 as a Republican candidate for Connecticut's 145th House of Representatives district against Democratic candidate Theresa Carlucci. Pavia lost his bid to retain the seat in the general election held in November of that year, and was succeeded in office by Christel Truglia. In 1992, Pavia faced incumbent George Jepsen of Connecticut's 27th State Senate District, and lost. He later served on the city council of Stamford, Connecticut and worked in the maintenance department at Stamford Hospital,then became a priest.

References

Living people
Year of birth missing (living people)
Mechanics (people)
Republican Party members of the Connecticut House of Representatives
20th-century American politicians
Connecticut city council members
Politicians from Stamford, Connecticut